is a railway station operated by East Japan Railway Company (JR East) in Tsurumi-ku, Yokohama, Kanagawa Prefecture, Japan.

Lines

Station layout
Bentembashi Station has an island platform serving two tracks.

Platforms

History
Bentembashi Station was opened on 10 March 1926 as the initial terminal station on the privately held  and initially for freight operations only. Passenger services started from 28 October 1930 when the line was extended to Tsurumi Station. The Tsurumi Rinkō line was nationalized on 1 July 1943, and was later absorbed into the Japan National Railways (JNR) network. The station has been unstaffed since 1 March 1971. Upon the privatization of the JNR on 1 April 1987 the station has been operated by JR East.

References

External links

 JR East Bentembashi Station